Perşembe (Turkish for "Thursday") is a town and district of Ordu Province on the Black Sea coast of Turkey.

Perşembe may also refer to several places:

 Perşembe, Zonguldak, a town in Çaycuma district of Zonguldak Province, Turkey
 Hoynat Islet, also called Perşembe Islet, a Turkish islet in the Black Sea
 Perşembe Plateau,  a high meadow and tourist attractions in the area of Aybastı, Turkey